Peter McLoughlin is an American businessman. He formerly served as team president for the Seattle Seahawks of the National Football League (NFL) from 2010 until 2018, and is also the CEO of Vulcan Sports & Entertainment.

Early career
McLoughlin began his career with six years at NBC Sports before eventually moving on to Anheuser-Busch where he worked for 21 years in a variety of roles. From 1998-2006 he was the VP/Corporate Media, ensuring that the company had product exclusivity in 15 Super Bowls, 10 Olympics and a dominant presence in MLB, NBA, NFL, NHL, NCAA, and World Cup telecasts.

St. Louis Blues
McLoughlin served as chief executive officer of the St. Louis Blues Enterprises from 2006-10. In this time, he was in charge of all non-hockey operations, including finance, ticket sales, marketing and new business development. He was the head figure in bringing in Scottrade to sign for the naming rights of the hockey arena and spearheaded several successful ticketing campaigns leading to 64 sellouts in two seasons compared to three in the previous two seasons.

Seattle Seahawks
McLoughlin was named team president of the Seattle Seahawks and First & Goal, Inc. on September 23, 2010, There, he was responsible for all financial and business operations, sales and marketing, sponsorship, and administration of the Seahawks. Additionally, as president of First & Goal, Inc., McLoughlin directs the management of CenturyLink Field, CenturyLink Field Event Center and WaMu Theater. He is the club’s chief representative at NFL owners meetings and also serves on NFL committees for Business Ventures, Digital Media, Stadium Security and Fan Behavior.

In late 2012, McLoughlin added the responsibility of the Portland Trail Blazers and Moda Center when Paul G. Allen named him CEO of Vulcan Sports and Entertainment. In this expanded role, McLoughlin has oversight of business operations for the Trail Blazers and Moda Center, while serving as an Alternate Governor for the Trail Blazers and representing the franchise at NBA owners meetings.

In 2016, McLoughlin’s seventh season with Seattle, the Seahawks reached the playoffs for the fifth-consecutive year while finishing the season with 122-consecutive sellouts. The Seahawks won their first NFL title in Super Bowl XLVIII, defeating the Denver Broncos, 43–8. In 2014, Seattle reached the Super Bowl for the second-consecutive season as the Seahawks faced the New England Patriots in Super Bowl XLIX. In September 2018, left the position on amicable terms, being succeeded by Chuck Arnold.

Personal
McLoughlin graduated from Deerfield Academy and later moved on to Harvard University with a degree in English literature.  He is married to wife, Kelly, and the couple has five children.

References

External links
Seahawks & Sounders President Peter McLoughlin On KING-5

Living people
American chief executives of professional sports organizations
Harvard University alumni
National Football League team presidents
St. Louis Blues executives
Seattle Seahawks executives
Deerfield Academy alumni
Year of birth missing (living people)